Amor non ho... però... però ("I did not love... but... but") is a 1951 Italian comedy film directed by Giorgio Bianchi.

Plot

Cast
 Renato Rascel: Teodoro 
 Gina Lollobrigida: Gina 
 Franca Marzi 
 Aroldo Tieri: Giuliano 
 : Kiki 
 Luigi Pavese: Antonio Scutipizzo 
 Nyta Dover 
 Guglielmo Barnabò 
 Carlo Ninchi: Maurizio 
 Virgilio Riento: Il contadino 
 Adriana Danieli: Olga 
 Galeazzo Benti 
 Strelsa Brown: Mabel 
 Marco Tulli   
 Riccardo Vianello

External links
 

1951 films
1950s Italian-language films
Italian comedy films
1951 comedy films
Films scored by Mario Nascimbene
Films set in Rome
Italian black-and-white films
1950s Italian films